Kalimpong district is a district in the state of West Bengal, India. Originally known as Dalingkot tehsil, the region was alternatively under the control of Sikkim and Bhutan. In 1865, it was annexed from Bhutan by British India under the Treaty of Sinchula, and administered as a subdivision of the Darjeeling district from 1916 to 2017. In 2017, it was carved out as a separate district to become the 21st district of West Bengal.

The district is headquartered at Kalimpong, which grew to prominence as a market town for Indo-Tibetan trade during the British period. It is bounded by Pakyong district of Sikkim in the north, Bhutan in the east, Darjeeling district in the west, and Jalpaiguri district in the south. The district consists of the Kalimpong Municipality and three community development blocks: Kalimpong I, Kalimpong II and Gorubathan.

Area
Apart from the Kalimpong municipality that consists of 23 wards, the district contains rural areas of 42 gram panchayats under three community development blocks: Kalimpong I, Kalimpong II, and Gorubathan.

History 

What is now Kalimpong district was originally under the kingdom of Sikkim. It was controlled through two hill forts in the region, at Damsang and Daling (or Dalingkot, meaning "Daling fort"). The region itself seems to have been referred to as Dalingkot. In 1718, the Kingdom of Bhutan annexed this territory, and ruled it for the next 150 years. The area was sparsely populated by the indigenous Lepcha community and migrant Bhutia, Limbu and Kirati tribes.

After the Anglo-Bhutan War in 1864, the Treaty of Sinchula (1865) was signed, in which certain hill territory to east of the Teesta River was ceded to the British East India Company. The precise territory was unspecified but included the fort of Dalingkot. In 1866–1867 an Anglo-Bhutanese commission demarcated the area, and set the Di Chu and Ni Chu rivers as the eastern boundary.

The ceded territory was added to the Western Duars district at first, and later transferred to the Darjeeling district in 1866. It was referred to as the "tract of Dalingkot" or "tract of Damsang", after the hill forts through it had been administered in the past. At that time, Kalimpong was a small hamlet, with only two or three families known to reside there. However the neighbourhood of Kalimpong was well-populated with several villages, as recorded by Ashley Eden during a mission to Bhutan in 1864. Eden mentioned that the people there were well-disposed to the British administration and had frequently traded with the Darjeeling area to the west of Tista in defiance of the Bhutanese authorities. 

The temperate climate prompted the British to develop the town as an alternative hill station to Darjeeling, to escape the scorching summer heat in the plains. Kalimpong's proximity to the Nathu La and Jelep La passes (La means "pass") for trading with Tibet was an added advantage. It soon became an important trading outpost in the trade of furs, wools and food grains between India and Tibet. The increase in commerce attracted large numbers of Nepali's from the neighbouring Nepal and the lower regions of Sikkim, the areas where, Nepalis were residing since the Gorkha invasion of Sikkim in 1790. The movement of people into the area, transformed Kalimpong from a small hamlet with a few houses, to a thriving town with increased economic prosperity. Britain assigned a plot within Kalimpong to the influential Bhutanese Dorji family, through which trade and relations with Bhutan flowed. This later became the Bhutan House, a Bhutanese administrative and cultural centre.

The arrival of Scottish missionaries saw the construction of schools and welfare centres for the British. Rev. W. Macfarlane in the early 1870s established the first schools in the area. The Scottish University Mission Institution was opened in 1886, followed by the Kalimpong Girls High School. In 1900, Reverend J.A. Graham founded the Dr. Graham's Homes for destitute Anglo-Indian students. The young missionary (and aspiring writer and poet) Aeneas Francon Williams, aged 24, arrived in Kalimpong in 1910 to take up the post of assistant schoolmaster at Dr. Graham's Homes, where he later became Bursar and remained working at the school for the next fourteen years. From 1907 onwards, most schools in Kalimpong had started offering education to Indian students. By 1911, the population comprised many ethnic groups, including Nepalis, Lepchas, Tibetans, Muslims, the Anglo-Indian communities. Hence by 1911, the population had swollen to 7,880.

Following Indian independence in 1947, Kalimpong became part of the state of West Bengal, after Bengal was partitioned between India and East Pakistan. With China's annexation of Tibet in 1959, many Buddhist monks fled Tibet and established monasteries in Kalimpong. These monks brought many rare Buddhist scriptures with them. In 1962, the permanent closure of the Jelep Pass after the Sino-Indian War disrupted trade between Tibet and India, and led to a slowdown in Kalimpong's economy. In 1976, the visiting Dalai Lama consecrated the Zang Dhok Palri Phodang monastery, which houses many of the scriptures.

Between 1986 and 1988, the demand for a separate state of Gorkhaland and Kamtapur based on ethnic lines grew strong. Riots between the Gorkha National Liberation Front (GNLF) and the West Bengal government reached a stand-off after a forty-day strike. The town was virtually under siege, and the state government called in the Indian army to maintain law and order. This led to the formation of the Darjeeling Gorkha Hill Council, a body that was given semi-autonomous powers to govern the Darjeeling district, except the area under the Siliguri subdivision. Since 2007, the demand for a separate Gorkhaland state has been revived by the Gorkha Janmukti Morcha and its supporters in the Darjeeling hills. The Kamtapur People's Party and its supporters' movement for a separate Kamtapur state covering North Bengal have gained momentum.

Blocks

Kalimpong I block
The Kalimpong I block consists of 18 gram panchayats; Bong, Kalimpong, Samalbong, Tista, Dr. Graham's Homes, Lower Echhay, Samthar, Neembong, Dungra, Upper Echhay, Seokbir, Bhalukhop, Yangmakum, Pabringtar, Sindebong, Kafer Kanke Bong, Pudung and Tashiding. This block has one police station at Kalimpong. The block is headquartered in Kalimpong.

Kalimpong II block
The Kalimpong II block consists of 13 gram panchayats, namely Dalapchand, Kashyong, Lolay, Lingseykha, Gitdabling, Lava-Gitbeong, Payong, Kagay, Lingse, Shangse, Pedong, Syakiyong and Shantook. This block is served by Kalimpong police station. The block is headquartered in Algarah. This block lies along border of Sikkim and Rhenock town of Pakyong district of Sikkim is a very important town for many villages of Kalimpong II block.

Gorubathan block
The Gorubathan block consists of 11 gram panchayats, namely Dalim, Gorubathan–I, Gorubathan–II, Patengodak, Todey Tangta, Kumai, Pokhreybong, Samsing, Aahaley, Nim and Rongo. This block has two police stations: Gorubathan and Jaldhaka. The block is headquartered in Fagu.

Legislative segments
As per order of the Delimitation Commission in respect of the delimitation of constituencies in West Bengal, the whole area under the district of Kalimpong (formerly Kalimpong subdivision), namely the Kalimpong municipality and the three blocks of Kalimpong–I, Kalimpong–II and Gorubathan together constitutes the Kalimpong assembly constituency of West Bengal. This constituency is part of Darjeeling Lok Sabha constituency. Darjeeling is represented by Neeraj Zimba of the Bharatiya Janata Party, while Kalimpong Assembly constituency is represented by Ruden Sada Lepcha of the Gorkha Janmukti Morcha (Tamang faction).

Demographics
According to the 2011 census, Kalimpong district (enumerated as Kalimpong subdivision then) has a population of 251,642. Kalimpong I block had a population of 74,746; Kalimpong II block had a population of 66,830; Gorubathan block had a population of 60,663; and Kalimpong Municipality had a population of 49,403. Scheduled Castes and Scheduled Tribes made up 16,433 (6.53%) and 74,976 (29.79%) of the population respectively.

Religion 

According to the 2011 census, Hindus numbered 153,355 (60.94%), Buddhists numbered 52,688 (20.94%), Christians numbered 37,453 (14.88%). Muslims numbered 3,998 (1.59%) of the population, while traditional faiths (such as Kirat Mundhum) were 3,243 (1.29%).

Languages 

At the time of the 1951 census, only 24% of those now living in Kalimpong district spoke Nepali as their mother tongue. Most of the population spoke a variety of other languages such as Rai, Limbu, Lepcha and Tamang, although nearly all could speak Nepali as a second language. By 1961, the proportion of people in Kalimpong returning Nepali as their mother tongue had jumped to 75%. This was accompanied by a dramatic fall in the numbers of other languages spoken by the variety of ethnic groups in the hills.

At the time of the 2011 census, 87.61% of the population spoke Nepali, 3.18% Hindi, 2.67% Lepcha and 1.16% Bhojpuri as their first language.

Flora and fauna

Mammals reported from this area are Indian leopard, five viverrid species, Asiatic black bear, sloth bear, Asian golden cat, wild boar, leopard cat, goral, serow, barking deer, sambar deer, flying squirrel, tahr, red panda and clouded leopard.

Transport

Roadways
National Highways
 National Highway 10 connecting Siliguri to Gangtok, lies in Kalimpong District from Kalijhora to Atal Setu Bridge, Rangpo via Teesta Bazaar, Rambi Bazar and Melli.

 National Highway-717A Connecting Bagrakote to Gangtok lies in Kalimpong district from Bagrakote to Resi Sikkim border, via Labha, Algarah, Pedong, and Kataray Bazar.

 National Highway 17 connecting Sevoke to Guwahati lies in Kalimpong district at Coronation Bridge - Mongpong area.

Railway
The currently functioning nearest railway station from Kalimpong district is Sivok railway station of Darjeeling district and Bagrakote Railway Station  of Jalpaiguri district.
The nearest major railway stations are Malbazar Junction, Siliguri Junction and New Jalpaiguri railway station.

The under construction Sevoke - Rangpo railway line lies in Kalimpong district from Kalijhora to 
Melli Railway Station via the following stations:
Riyang Railway Station and
Tista Bazaar Railway Station

Airways
Bagdogra Airport is the nearest airport from southern parts of Kalimpong district, and Pakyong Airport is the nearest airport from northern areas of Kalimpong district.

Rivers
The major rivers flowing through Kalimpong district are River Teesta, River Jaldhaka and River Rangpo. Other rivers are Relli Khola, Riyang Khola,Murti Khola, Reshi Khola, Chel Khola, River Ghish, Bindu Khola, Les Khola,  Neora Khola etc.

Notes

References

Bibliography

External links

 
 Kalimpong district, OpenStreetMap, retrieved 2 December 2021.

 
Districts of West Bengal